Music Has No Boundaries, also known as MHNB, is the third studio album by Moroccan singer-songwriter Ahmed Soultan, released on 23 January 2016 by Somum Records. the album marks Soultan's return after 7 years since his last album Code released in 2009.

Ahmed Soutlan collaborated with many artists on the album, including George Clinton, Femi Kuti, Fred Wesley, Pee Wee Ellis and RZA.

Release 
Ahmed Soultan intends to make the album available in 60 stores, Music Has No Boundaries was released in Morocco on 23 January 2016 at all Virgin Megastores across the country, and on 30 January 2016 in Carrefour Market stores. Album signing events were held in Virgin Megastores to promote the album.

Track listing

References

2016 albums
Ahmed Soultan albums